Nashua Community College (NCC) is a public community college in Nashua, New Hampshire. It is part of the Community College System of New Hampshire. Enrollment was 2,422 students in 2013 and 1,798 students in 2017, most of them part-time.

History
The present campus was completed in 1970 to designs by Manchester architects Koehler & Isaak.

Academics
NCC offers 35 associate degree programs and 22 certificate programs.

Notable alumni

References

External links

Community colleges in New Hampshire
Universities and colleges in Hillsborough County, New Hampshire
Education in Nashua, New Hampshire
USCAA member institutions
Buildings and structures in Nashua, New Hampshire
1970 establishments in New Hampshire
Educational institutions established in 1970